Howmeh District is in Azarshahr County, East Azerbaijan province, Iran. At the 2006 census, its population was 64,796 in 17,125 households. The following census in 2011 counted 69,260 people in 20,456 households. At the latest census in 2016, the district had 73,544 inhabitants living in 23,309 households.

References 

Azarshahr County

Districts of East Azerbaijan Province

Populated places in East Azerbaijan Province

Populated places in Azarshahr County